Shipwreck Moraine is an extensive moraine in a valley beside the Benson Glacier, between Black Pudding Peak and Mount Brogger, in Prince Albert Mountains, Victoria Land. It was named by a 1989-90 New Zealand Antarctic Research Programme (NZARP) field party member Trevor Chinn to commemorate an incident at the site. On a descent to the moraine, a motor toboggan and a sledge ran onto blue ice thinly disguised by snow and careened out of control down the slope, tossing gear and personnel overboard as the sledge overturned.

Moraines of the Ross Dependency
Landforms of Victoria Land
Scott Coast